Cesáreo Barrera (born 5 November 1942) is a Spanish boxer. He competed in the men's light middleweight event at the 1960 Summer Olympics.

References

1942 births
Living people
Spanish male boxers
Olympic boxers of Spain
Boxers at the 1960 Summer Olympics
Sportspeople from Las Palmas
Mediterranean Games silver medalists for Spain
Mediterranean Games medalists in boxing
Competitors at the 1959 Mediterranean Games
Light-middleweight boxers